Don Baldwin (born November 15, 1977) is an American former competitive pair skater. With Tiffany Vise, he is the 2010 Ice Challenge silver medalist and 2012 U.S. International Figure Skating Classic bronze medalist. They were a mirror pair team, with Baldwin spinning counter-clockwise and Vise spinning clockwise.

Personal life
Baldwin has a Bachelor of Science degree in Mechanical and Aerospace Engineering. He is the brother of John Baldwin, also a competitive pair skater, and the son of John Baldwin, Sr.

Don Baldwin married Tiffany Vise on August 23, 2015, in San Diego, California.

Career
Early in his career, Baldwin competed with Jennifer Brunn.

He teamed up with Tiffany Vise in March 2009. They won the senior pairs' event at the Pacific Coast Sectional Championships. Internationally, the pair won silver at the 2010 Ice Challenge in Graz, Austria, and bronze at the 2012 U.S. International Figure Skating Classic. They received three Grand Prix assignments and finished 6th at all three events. They were coached by Lara Ladret and Doug Ladret in Scottsdale, Arizona.

They announced their retirement from competition on April 4, 2013 and said that they would coach together at the Ice Den in Scottsdale, Arizona.

Programs 
(with Vise)

Competitive highlights 
GP: Grand Prix

With Vise

References

External links 

 

Living people
1977 births
American male pair skaters
Sportspeople from Evanston, Illinois